C-3 was a C-class submarine of the Spanish Republican Navy. C-3 was built by Sociedad Española de Construcción Naval (SECN) in Cartagena, Spain, launched 20 February 1929, and commissioned on 4 May 1929.

Pre-war 
On 14 September 1931, C-3 successfully tested Génova's submarine rescue chamber (similar to the McCann Submarine Rescue Chamber) in Escombreras inlet. Developed by Capitán de Corbeta (Lieutenant Commander) Arturo Génova Torrecuellar, this was subsequently installed in all C-class submarines as a portable unit, as well as the subsequent D-class, which used a fixed unit.

Civil War 

At the start of the Civil War, 18 July 1936, C-3 was in Cartagena harbour, under command of Teniente de Navío (Lieutenant) Rafael Viniegra González. He was ordered to sortie from Cartagena in company with submarines B-6, Isaac Peral (C-1), C-4 and C-6, bound for the Gibraltar Strait. In command of the flotilla was the Capitán de Fragata (Commander) Francisco Guimerá Bosch, the mission was to blockade the strait and interdict transport of rebel troops from North Africa to the Iberian Peninsula. They took a patrol line along the Andalusian coast

Only two days into the operation, on 20 July, the flotilla entered Málaga harbour, where Guimerá, Viniegra (along with C-3's executive officer), and the rest of the flotilla's senior officers, with the exception of Isaac Peral (C-1)'s skipper, Capitán de Corbeta Lara, were relieved and transferred to the prison ship Monte Toro because they were considered sympathizers of the rebels.

Next morning, 21 July, C-3, joined by B-6, departed Málaga bound for Tangier to protect the oil tanker Ophir. On 27 July, all destroyers and submarines in Málaga deployed around Cadiz to intercept a Nationalist convoy that proved to be a decoy. Then she, C-2, and C-6 received instructions to form a patrol arc in front of Ceuta harbour to prevent the entrance of the cruiser Almirante Cervera, which had left Ferrol bound for the Gibraltar Strait.

1 August, at Málaga, C-3 took on remaining anti-aircraft ammunition and torpedoes before C-4 departed for Cartagena for minor repairs

Two weeks later, on 15 August, C-3 sailed for the Cantabric Sea with the C-6, returned to Cartagena with average. She repeated the voyage 25 August, in company with C-4 and C-5, where C-3 and C-6 jointly attempted to locate and sink the battleship España and Almirante Cervera, without success. She also aided in the search for transports bringing weapons to Bilbao.

C-3 returned to the Mediterranean Sea on 2 October, arriving in Málaga 8 October.

On 12 December 1936, C-3 was running surfaced 4 nm (7½ km) southeast of Málaga. In the conning tower was her commander, Alférez de Navío (Ensign) Antonio Arbona Pastor, and a merchant navy pilot attached to the Republican Navy. At 14:19, there was a sudden explosion on her starboard bow, and C-3 disappeared. The explosion was observed by the coastguard vessel Xauen, lying two miles (3.7 km) inshore of C-3, and the fishing boats Joven Antonio  and Joven Amalia, about the same distance away. Despite their proximity, the only survivors were the pilot, García Viñas, and two of C-3's sailors, Isidoro de la Orden Ibáñez and Asensio Lidón Jiménez, who had been topside dumping trash and garbage.

For this action, Grosse received the "Goldenes Spanienkreuz" (Spanish golden cross).

Over the next few days, Republican authorities attempted to locate C-3, but only found a large oil slick. The position was marked by buoy, but no rescue attempted, and it is likely there were none left alive aboard. Subsequently, when Málaga fell to the Nationalists, C-3 was forgotten. The Nationalists, in an attempt to conceal the acquisition of two Italian Archimede-class submarines—General Mola (ex-)  and General Sanjurjo,(ex-)—renamed them C-3 and  C-5, claiming C-3 was raised and recommissioned by the Nationalist Navy. This maneuver was unsuccessful; the Italian boats bore distinct structural differences. C-3 was stricken by ministerial order on 31 July 1941.

Wreck found 

In 1997, Málaga's lawyer Antonio Checa discovered the remains of a shipwreck, he sensed it was C-3. Despite several dives by an ROV (Remote Operated Vehicle) with video camera, it proved impossible to positively identify the wreck, owing to bad visibility.

In October 1998, The Spanish Navy sent the rescue ship Mar Rojo (A-20 ) with a navy dive team. They identified wreck as C-3, at the position . They found her hull had broken in two. One section eight meters from bow was separated from the rest. Both parts remain in a sand plain, separated by a few meters, the biggest upright, the smaller inverted.

Notes

References

External links 

  Submarine C3 
  C3 in memoriam 
 Video en Youtube
 Operación Úrsula: El Misterio del submarino C-3 

C-class submarines of the Spanish Navy
Ships built in Cartagena, Spain
1929 ships
Spanish Republican Navy
Military units and formations of the Spanish Civil War
Ships sunk by German submarines
Shipwrecks in the Mediterranean Sea
Maritime incidents in 1936
Shipwrecks of the Spanish Civil War
Mediterranean naval operations of the Spanish Civil War
Submarines sunk by submarines